Heure du Berger  was a small corvette of the French Navy. She is notable for discovering a new route from Mauritius to India.

Career
In 1767, Ensign Grenier took Heure du Berger for a voyage of exploration in the Indian Ocean, with astronomer Rochon, and discovered a new, quicker route from Isle de France to India.

In 1772, commended by Amiral de Saint-Félix, in charge to find legendary island San-Juan-de-Lisboa, in the Indian Ocean.

Notes, citations, and references 
Notes

Citations

References
 
 
 
 

Corvettes of the French Navy